Radostin Lyubomirov Stanev (born 11 July 1975 in Varna) is a former Bulgarian football player who played as a goalkeeper.

Career

In Bulgaria
Stanev started his career in Varna in the local Spartak. In 1998, he played for six months in CSKA Sofia. After that he signed with Lokomotiv Sofia.  Between January 2008 and May 2008 Stanev played again in Spartak Varna. In June 2008 he signed with newly promoted Lokomotiv Mezdra.

Foreign clubs
In January 2002 Stanev signed with a club from Poland – KP Legia Warsaw. The next year he went to Russia and played one season for FC Shinnik Yaroslavl. In 2004, he signed with the Romanian FC Progresul București. In his first months in Romania he grew at odds with his coach, and for two years played only in 9 matches. In June 2006 his contract with FC Progresul București was rejected and he signed with Aris Limassol F.C.

External links
 
 

1975 births
Living people
Association football goalkeepers
Bulgarian footballers
Bulgarian expatriate footballers
First Professional Football League (Bulgaria) players
Russian Premier League players
Ekstraklasa players
Liga I players
Cypriot First Division players
FC Lokomotiv 1929 Sofia players
PFC CSKA Sofia players
PFC Spartak Varna players
FC Shinnik Yaroslavl players
Aris Limassol FC players
PFC Lokomotiv Mezdra players
FC Progresul București players
Legia Warsaw players
Expatriate footballers in Cyprus
Expatriate footballers in Romania
Expatriate footballers in Russia
Expatriate footballers in Poland
Sportspeople from Varna, Bulgaria